Scopula densicornis is a moth of the  family Geometridae. It is found on Sumba.

References

Moths described in 1897
densicornis
Moths of Indonesia